Charles Lemontier (1894–1965) was a French film actor.

Selected filmography

 Street Without a Name (1934)
 Judex (1934)
 Crime and Punishment (1935)
 Rigolboche (1936)
 You Can't Fool Antoinette (1936)
 The Assault (1936)
 Seven Men, One Woman (1936)
 Gigolette (1937)
 Three Waltzes (1938)
 The Little Thing (1938)
 In the Sun of Marseille (1938)
 The Fatted Calf (1939)
 Malaria (1943)
 The White Truck (1943)
 Mademoiselle X (1945)
 Roger la Honte (1946)
 Night Warning (1946)
 Mandrin (1947)
 Dark Sunday (1948)
 Ruy Blas (1948)
 The Secret of Monte Cristo (1948)
 The Secret of Mayerling (1949)
 The Red Angel (1949)
 Sending of Flowers (1950)
 Born of Unknown Father (1950)
 Clear the Ring (1950)
 Atoll K (1951)
 Maria of the End of the World (1951)
 Run Away Mr. Perle (1952)
 My Wife, My Cow and Me (1952)
 The Porter from Maxim's (1953)
 Little Jacques (1953)
 April Fools' Day (1954)
 It Happened in Aden (1956)
 In the Manner of Sherlock Holmes (1956)
 Lovers of Paris (1957)
 The Enigma of the Folies-Bergere (1959)

References

Bibliography
 Norbert Aping. The Final Film of Laurel and Hardy: A Study of the Chaotic Making and Marketing of Atoll K. McFarland, 2008.

External links

1894 births
1965 deaths
French male film actors
People from Toul